Gladstone is a former provincial electoral division in the Canadian province of Manitoba.  It was created in 1879 in what was then the province's western tip, with the expansion of the province's western boundary, and eliminated by redistribution in 1881.  It was re-established in 1903 (primarily from the old riding of Westbourne) and was not abolished again until 1999. 

The Gladstone riding was primarily rural, and its MLAs, regardless of party affiliation, were generally regarded as representatives of the farming community.  The Manitoba Liberal Party dominated until that party lost most of its rural base in 1969; after this, it was effectively safe for the Progressive Conservative Party.

MLA William Morton was re-elected by acclamation in every provincial election from 1941 to 1953.

List of provincial representatives

Former provincial electoral districts of Manitoba